Windmill Point is the former name of Goose Village, Montreal.

Windmill Point may also refer to:

Windmill Point, the former name of Pemberton Point, Hull.
Windmill Point Light, the name of several lighthouses:
Windmill Point Light (Michigan), in Detroit, Michigan
Windmill Point Light (Vermont), in Lake Champlain
Windmill Point Light (Virginia), in the Chesapeake Bay
Windmill Point Light (Ontario), in Prescott, Ontario, Canada